James Gray Carr (born November 14, 1940) is a senior United States district judge of the United States District Court for the Northern District of Ohio.

Education and career

Carr was born in Boston, Massachusetts. He received a Bachelor of Arts degree from Kenyon College in 1962, and a Bachelor of Laws from Harvard Law School in 1969. He was in private practice of law in Chicago, Illinois from 1966 to 1968. He was a Staff attorney of the Cook County Legal Assistance Foundation from 1968 to 1970. He was then an adjunct professor at the Chicago-Kent College of Law (Illinois Institute of Technology) in 1969, and at Loyola University Chicago School of Law in 1970. He was an associate professor at the University of Toledo College of Law from 1970 to 1979. While he was a professor, Carr was also an assistant prosecutor at the Lucas County Prosecutor's Office in Ohio from 1972 to 1973.

Federal judicial service

He later became a United States Magistrate of the United States District Court for the Northern District of Ohio in 1979, and was nominated by President Bill Clinton on January 27, 1994, to a seat on that court vacated by Richard B. McQuade, Jr. He was confirmed by the United States Senate on May 6, 1994, and received his commission on May 9. Chief Justice William Rehnquist appointed Judge Carr to the Foreign Intelligence Surveillance Court on May 19, 2002. Carr served as chief judge of the District Court from 2004 to 2010. His term on the FISA Court expired in 2008.

Notable case

In April 2017, Carr ruled that Ohio could not fine railroad companies for blocking roads.

References

  

1940 births
Living people
Harvard Law School alumni
Kenyon College alumni
Lawyers from Boston
Loyola University Chicago faculty
Illinois Institute of Technology faculty
Judges of the United States District Court for the Northern District of Ohio
Loyola University Chicago School of Law alumni
United States district court judges appointed by Bill Clinton
United States magistrate judges
University of Toledo faculty
Judges of the United States Foreign Intelligence Surveillance Court
20th-century American judges
21st-century American judges